Osawatomie may refer to:

Osawatomie Brown, an 1859 play by Kate Edwards about John Brown.
John "Osawatomie" Brown, the abolitionist.
Osawatomie High School
Osawatomie, Kansas
Osawatomie (periodical)